Feldzug in Polen (The Campaign in Poland) is a 69-minute Nazi propaganda film released in 1940 depicting the 1939 invasion of Poland and directed by Fritz Hippler. Portraying the Poles as aggressors and ethnic Germans living in Poland as an oppressed minority, the film alleges that the Poles employed unheroic tactics in the war and characterizes as senseless the defence of a besieged Warsaw. The film was often screened by German minorities overseas to clarify the German point of view.

French involvement was de-emphasized, in order to present Great Britain, in its attempt to encircle Germany, as the villain, to justify the Nazi-Soviet pact. Polish provocations finally resulted in the blitzkrieg, led by Hitler; Poles were sometimes depicted as brave, to emphasize the German triumph.

Release
Its premiere was held in the Berlin Ufa-Palast um Zoo, usually used by Goebbels to present important films. It received massive media support and was officially described as "valuable from a political viewpoint," "artistically valuable," "educational for the nation," and "a film of instruction.

See also 
List of German films 1933-1945
List of films set in Warsaw

References

External links 
Information on the film from International Historic Films

The full film (in German, no English subtitles)  at archive.org.

1940 films
1940 documentary films
Black-and-white documentary films
German documentary films
Films of Nazi Germany
Nazi World War II propaganda films
Films directed by Fritz Hippler
German black-and-white films